O Descobrimento do Brasil is the sixth studio album by Brazilian rock band Legião Urbana. Released in November 1993, it sold more than a half million copies and was certified double platinum by ABPD.

Background
O Descobrimento do Brasil was the band's first album without Jorge Davidson as artistic manager of EMI-Odeon - he was then working at Sony Music and was replaced by João Augusto.

The album was created in a moment of tension between the band and the label. By then, EMI had sold its album factory and was using Fonobras, which belonged to their competitor PolyGram. Coincidentally, the band's producer Mayrton Bahia was working there and knew from an incoming request that EMI-Odeon intended to release a compilation without the band's consent. Furious, the members tagged the walls of the company's management department. Vocalist, acoustic guitarist and keyboardist Renato Russo particularly wrote some sentences in English, including "You treat us like trash! You'll never do it anymore!".

Unaware of what the label would do to them, they suspended the album sessions until the company made a move. In the end, EMI cancelled the compilation. That was one of the reasons João Augusto proceeded with caution when initiating his relationship with the band.

Recording 
The band got into the studio in August 1993 and the album was ready by October. The members experimented with new instruments, besides playing each others'. Drummer Marcelo Bonfá played the keyboards, while guitarist Dado Villa-Lobos experimented with the dobro and the mandolin and Russo recorded a performance with the sitar. Working on the album, they became one of the first Brazilian groups to use Pro Tools in studio to do minor sound fixes.

Content

Cover art 
The cover was supposed to convey the moment of lightness and optimism that the band was experiencing by the time of the album's release. It depicts the members in a flowery field especially set for the shot, each of them wearing a different attire: Russo is dressed like a medieval knight, Villa-Lobos as a hunter with a mandolin and Bonfá as a peasant. The photograph was taken by Flávio Colker. On the day of the photo sessions, Villa-Lobos had his car and his mandolin stolen in front of the studio and the band had to replace the instrument.

Booklet 
The booklet had in its last page the sentence "Ah, but I was so much older then, I'm younger than that now", taken from the song "My Back Pages" by Bob Dylan. The band also thanked Léo Jaime (misspelled as "Leo Jayme"), who lent them his dobro. There's also a dedication to the band's touring bassist Tavinho Fialho, who died in a car crash in the year of the album's release.

Music 
The album was titled O Descobrimento do Brasil because it came in a time when Russo was recovering from drugs and the other members were optimistic about the future. Besides, as Russo told Jornal do Brasil, "we believe in Brazil. There are many nice things. They want us to be thieves, to be like they are. But we're not."

The band intended to do a different work than the previous release, V, which brought, according to them, "those progressive songs, with a melancholic load". The idea of the new album, in Russo's view, was for it to be a collection of short pop singles.

The opening track "Vinte e Nove" mentions Russo's alcoholism, as well as "Só Por Hoje", (the Portuguese-language version of "Just For Today") which reproduces a motto of the Alcoholics Anonymous. "Perfeição" received a video with the same flowery design of the album cover. It was the last Legião Urbana music video.

"Um Dia Perfeito" reflects the album's optimism and features a child choir composed of Nico and Mimi, Dado's children; and their friends Gabri, Antonio, Rafa, Pedro and Juju.

"Love in the Afternoon" is a tribute to bassist Tavinho Fialho. The album was dedicated to him.

Track listing

Personnel 
Source:
 Renato Russo - lead vocals, acoustic and electric guitars, bass guitar, keyboards, sitar 
 Dado Villa-Lobos - electric and acoustic guitars, bass guitar, mandolin , dobro 
 Marcelo Bonfá - drums, percussion, keyboards 
 Flávio Colker - cover picture

Tour 
The album's tour was the band's last one and featured Gian Fabra as touring bassist, replacing Fialho.

According to manager Rafael Borges, Russo "wanted to and didn't want to perform live". He even scheduled some shows which would coincide with Brazil's matches at the World Cup. Back then, he thought he never delivered what he could on stage and always assumed the audience gave him more than they got.

Legião Urbana's last show happened at Reggae Night, in Santos, on the coast of São Paulo state. Eventually, cans began to be thrown at the band. When Russo got git, he lied down on the ground, hiding his body from the audience, and there he sang for 45 minutes. The audience would only see his arm, which he raised up to check on his watch and make it clear to everyone that he was looking forward to the end of the show.

Covers
Argentinian punk rock band Attaque 77 covered "Perfeição".

Sales and certifications

References

 

1993 albums
Legião Urbana albums